Frånö was a locality situated in Kramfors Municipality, Västernorrland County, Sweden with 640 inhabitants in 2010. Since 2015, it is included in the urban area of Kramfors.

References 

Populated places in Kramfors Municipality
Ångermanland